The 2017–18 season was Oud-Heverlee Leuven's 16th competitive season in professional football and the team's second consecutive season at the second level following their relegation from the Belgian Pro League in 2016. It was also the first season under the ownership of the King Power International Group lead by Vichai Srivaddhanaprabha.

OH Leuven lost points early throughout the season as several key starting players arrived only late in the 2017 summer transfer window, resulting in a poor league start of 2 wins, 4 draws and 1 loss from the opening 7 games. The team was not able to overtake Beerschot-Wilrijk anymore during the opening tournament, missing the first chance to qualify for the promotion play-offs by three points.

In the closing tournament the team again started mediocre, drawing against struggling teams Roeselare, Union SG and Tubize to set up a crucial away match to Cercle Brugge already on matchday 6, which was lost 1-0 against ten men. OH Leuven thereafter never managed to close the gap to Cercle Brugge and had to settle for the Europa League play-off matches, in which they scored wins against Waasland-Beveren and Excel Mouscron and a draw against a strong Zulte Waregem. Eventually the team ended fourth after finishing the season by being thrashed 5-0 away to Excel Mouscron, a score which was on the scoreboard already at half-time.

In the cup, the team strolled past Turnhout (playing two divisions lower) with seven different players scoring in an 8-0 win, before being eliminated after extra time by top division team Sint-Truiden. OH Leuven managed to come back from a deficit twice, the second time far into extra-time when down to nine men.

2017–18 squad
This section lists players who were in Oud-Heveree Leuven's first team squad at any point during the 2017–18 season
The symbol § indicates player left mid-season
The symbol # indicates player joined mid-season
The symbol ¥ indicates a youngster who has appeared on the match sheet at least once during the season (possibly as unused substitute) 
Italics indicate loan player

Transfers

During the summer of 2017, OH Leuven was very active on the transfer market, although initially this was most noticeable on the outgoing side with the contracts of Nicolas Delporte, Nathan Durieux, Jonathan Kindermans and Fazlı Kocabaş not being prolonged and five loan players returning to their parent clubs: Nathan de Medina returned to Anderlecht, Siebe Horemans, Lucas Schoofs and Serge Tabekou all returned to Gent and Yannick Loemba returned to Oostende. No official news was released at the time about Jeroen Simaeys, who had suffered a serious injury early 2017, but he was no longer being presented as part of the squad in spite of having a running contract. Early 2018 it would become apparent that the injury had effectively ended Simaeys' professional football career and that he had found an agreement with the club to terminate his contract early. On top of this in May Belgian First Amateur Division team Heist announced the signing of defender Mehdi Bounou, while Kenneth Houdret moved to direct opponents Union SG. On the incoming side, OH Leuven announced mid May the dual signing of defenders Clément Fabre (from Tubize) and Kenneth Schuermans (from Westerlo), while also mentioning that goalkeeper Laurent Henkinet had extended his contract by three seasons until 2020. Early June saw two further departures, with first Soufiane El Banouhi following Kenneth Houdret to Union SG, followed by Romain Reynaud who moved to French fourth tier team Andrézieux-Bouthéon. Later that month three more players departed the squad as Pieter-Jan Monteyne moved to Roeselare, Pierre-Yves Ngawa was signed by Serie B team Avellino and Ben Yagan moved to the Belgian First Amateur Division to play for Dessel Sport, while on the incoming side OH Leuven strengthened the squad with four players: Geert Berben was seen as a promising youngster and picked up from relegated Lommel United, experienced French midfielder Julien Gorius was brought in for free from Chinese team Changchun Yatai and with Yannick Aguemon (from Union SG) and Nikola Storm (again on loan from Club Brugge), two fast wingers were added to the squad. Storm had already been on loan since the 2016–17 winter transfer window but the loan was extended for another season. In July, the team signed three Belgian players, young midfielder Mathieu Maertens was brought in from Cercle Brugge, while defenders Derrick Tshimanga (from Willem II) and Dimitri Daeseleire (from Antwerp) were brought in for their experience. Meanwhile, Simon Bracke and Cédric D'Ulivo left the team, respectively to Hasselt and Icelandic team FH. Traditionally, OH Leuven was very active in the month of August. As newly signed player Clément Fabre had suffered a serious injury near the end of July, which meant he would be unavailable for at least several months, two more defenders were brought in: Ivorian international Mamadou Bagayoko was signed from Sint-Truiden while English youth international Elliott Moore arrived on loan from Leicester City, with that transfer being arranged due to the fact that both OH Leuven and Leicester were now under ownership of King Power. Furthermore, experienced midfielder David Hubert was signed from Gent and the offensive department was reinforced with two foreign strikers, Scotsman Tony Watt from Charlton Athletic and Senegalese Simon Diedhiou from Gent. Four Belgian youngsters were sent out on loans to various teams playing in the 2017–18 Belgian First Amateur Division to get more playing time: Benjamin Bambi and Jordy Lokando were sent to Heist, striker Din Sula to Lommel and winger Leo Njengo to Dessel Sport. Finally, on transfer deadline day, three more players arrived: defender Benjamin Boulenger was loaned from Charleroi, 20 year old Nigerian winger Godwin Odibo was signed from Nath Boys Academy and experienced Belgian defender Koen Persoons was brought in from Lokeren. Although Ivorian international goalkeeper Copa had announced his retirement already a few weeks before, he arrived one day after the end of the transfer window on a free basis from Lokeren as an experienced backup and coach for Nick Gillekens, Laurent Henkinet and youngster Andreas Suederick.

During the 2017–18 winter transfer window, OH Leuven was much less active. Geert Berben had both not been receiving much playing time and was therefore loaned out to Oosterzonen Oosterwijk. Also loaned out was Thomas Azevedo, who was unhappy to be used only as a substitute and returned on loan to his former team Lommel. Finally, Mamadou Bagayoko, who had only been signed during the summer and did feature regularly in the team, was loaned out to Belgian First Division A team Mechelen where he was again reunited with Dennis van Wijk who was previously in charge at OH Leuven when Bagayoko joined the team. On the incoming side, despite already having four goalkeepers, the Thai owners behind Kind Power brought in Thailand national football team first goalkeeper Kawin Thamsatchanan from Muangthong United on a five-year deal. Furthermore, midfielder Samy Kehli was loaned from Lokeren, winger Joeri Dequevy arrived from Antwerp where he was deemed surplus and Ghanaian youngster Kamal Sowah became the second player on loan from Leicester City as he arrived on an 18-month deal until the summer of 2019. In February, Tony Watt was released after failing to make an impression.

Transfers In

Transfers Out

Belgian First Division B

OHL's season in the Belgian First Division B began on 5 August 2017.

Results

Europa League play-offs

OHL qualified for the Europa League play-offs based on their league position in the 2017–18 Belgian First Division B.

Results

Belgian Cup

Results

Squad statistics

Appearances
Players with no appearances not included in the list.

Goalscorers
Includes all competitive matches.

Clean sheets 
Includes all competitive matches.

Footnotes

References

External links
 

2017-18
Belgian football clubs 2017–18 season
Oud-Heverlee Leuven seasons